Kaveinga bellorum is a species of ground beetle in the subfamily Rhysodinae. It was described by Emberson in 1995.

References

Kaveinga
Beetles described in 1995